Cerocala contraria  is a moth of the family Erebidae.

Distribution
It is found in South & East Africa, where it is known from Kenya, South Africa and Zimbabwe.

References

Ophiusina
Lepidoptera of Kenya
Lepidoptera of South Africa
Lepidoptera of Zimbabwe
Moths of Sub-Saharan Africa
Moths described in 1865